The Democratic Party (DP) was a political party in South Korea. Formerly founded as the Centrist United Democratic Party (CUDP) after the merger of the Democratic Party (2000), it merged with the Grand Unified Democratic New Party in February 2008.

History

On 27 June 2007, the Democratic Party (2000) and Central Reform United New Party merged and formed the Centrist United Democratic Party.

On August 13, 2007, the party changed its name to the Democratic Party.

In-je was elected the party's Presidential candidate by the delegates on 14 October 2007, but received poor results in the election on December 19: He obtained only 0.7% of the vote

On 18 February 2008, the party merged with the Grand Unified Democratic New Party to form the United Democratic Party.

Election results

See also
List of political parties in South Korea
Politics of South Korea
Elections in South Korea
Liberalism in South Korea
Liberalism
Contributions to liberal theory
Liberalism worldwide
List of liberal parties
Liberal democracy

References

Democratic parties in South Korea
Defunct political parties in South Korea
Political parties established in 2007
Political parties disestablished in 2008